Boris Leutar (born 20 August 1978) is a former Croatian football player who spent the majority of his career playing for HNK Cibalia.

External links
Boris Leutar profile at Nogometni Magazin 

1978 births
Living people
Sportspeople from Vinkovci
Croatian footballers
Croatian Football League players
GNK Dinamo Zagreb players
HNK Cibalia players
Association football defenders